opened in Ebetsu, Hokkaidō, Japan in 1991. The museum documents the history of Ebetsu from ancient times, with themes including settlement during the days of the Hokkaido Development Commission and the city's industries. The collection includes two dogū from the Jōmon-period Ōasa III Site, as well two assemblages of Zoku-Jōmon artefacts that have been designated Important Cultural Properties, from the Motoebetsu I Site and the Ebetsubuto Site.

See also
 List of Cultural Properties of Japan - archaeological materials (Hokkaidō)
 List of Historic Sites of Japan (Hokkaidō)
 Hokkaido Archaeological Operations Center
 Hokkaido Museum

References

External links
 Ebetsu City Historical Museum

Ebetsu, Hokkaido
Museums in Hokkaido
Museums established in 1991
1991 establishments in Japan

History museums in Japan